Jeanne de Vietinghoff (31 December 1875 – 15 June 1926) was a Belgian writer who published several books on ethical, mystical and religious topics.
She was the mother of the painter and philosopher Egon von Vietinghoff.

Life

Jeanne Céline Emma Bricou was born on 31 December 1875 in Schaerbeek, now a district of Brussels, Belgium.
Her parents were Alexis Pierre Joseph Bricou, a chandler and trader in sponges and chamois leather at the Nouveau Marché aux Grains, 9, in Brussels  (1825–77), and his third wife Emma Antoinette Isaure Storm de Grave (1841–1933), who came from a patrician Dutch family.
She was their only child, and her father died when she was 18 months old.
Although she was a Protestant she received her secondary education at the Catholic Sacré-Coeur convent school in Jette, on the outskirts of Brussels.
The Francophone boarding school was run by the Sisters of the Sacred Heart.
Jeanne was sent there to perfect her French.
Her closest friend there was Fernande Cartier de Marchienne, who would be the mother of the writer Marguerite Yourcenar.
The two girls formed an intimate relationship.

Jeanne met the Baltic German Baron Conrad von Vietinghoff at a lecture on a spiritual topic in Dresden, and married him on 17 April 1902 in the Hague, Netherlands.
Her husband was a musician.
They lived for about two years in Courland, Latvia, home of Conrad's parents, then in Saint Petersburg and in Germany before moving to Holland.
They had two sons: Egon (1903) and Alexis (1904).
In 1905 Jeanne learned of her former classmate Fernande's death, and wrote inviting her husband Michel de Crayencour to come with his daughter Marguerite for a vacation at her mother's summer house in Scheveningen, by the sea.
The young Egon de Vietinghoff recalled spending time on the beach with Marguerite Yourcenar, who was the same age as him.

Jeanne and her husband shared a common sense of dignity, integrity, ethics and religion, and their home became a meeting place for people interested in art and intellectual discussion.
They lived in Paris, Wiesbaden, Geneva and Zürich.
Visitors included Romain Rolland, Maurice Maeterlinck, Guy de Pourtalès, Pablo Casals and Carl Schuricht.
The family often visited Jeanne's mother in the Netherlands, and travelled in France, Italy, Germany, the Baltic States and Switzerland, sometimes taking the children's governess with them.
Despite this busy life, Jeanne took the time to write five books of reflections on life, the soul, personal crises, spiritual development and the divine influence.
She developed liver cancer at the age of 50.
She died on 15 June 1926 in Pully, near Lausanne, Switzerland.
She was buried in the Jouxtens cemetery above Lake Geneva near Lausanne.

Marguerite Yourcenar published a tribute to Jeanne de Vietinghoff in La Revue Mondiale.
Towards the end she wrote,

Publication

Publications included:

Notes

Sources

1875 births
1926 deaths
Belgian writers in French
People from Schaerbeek